Sail for Gold is an annual sailing regatta in Weymouth, the United Kingdom. The regatta was first held in 2006 and hosts the Olympic and Paralympic classes.

It is part of the 2014 EUROSAF Champions Sailing Cup.

Winners

Men's 470

2006 –  Nick Rogers & Joe Glanfield
2007 –  Nick Rogers & Joe Glanfield
2008 –  Nick Rogers & Joe Glanfield
2009 –  Nic Asher & Elliot Willis
2010 –  Pierre Leboucher & Vincent Garos
2011 –  Pierre Leboucher & Vincent Garos
2012 –  Mathew Belcher & Malcolm Page
2014 –  Luke Patience & Elliot Willis
2015 –  Stuart McNay & David Hughes

Men's 49er

2006 –  Iker Martínez de Lizarduy & Xabier Fernández
2007 –  John Pink & Simon Wheeler
2008 –  Stevie Morrison & Ben Rhodes
2009 –  Nathan Outteridge & Iain Jensen
2010 –  Nathan Outteridge & Iain Jensen
2011 –  Nathan Outteridge & Iain Jensen
2012 –  Nathan Outteridge & Iain Jensen
2013 –  Ryan Seaton & Matthew McGovern
2014 –  David Evans & Edward Powys
2015 –  Peter Burling & Blair Tuke

Men's Finn

2006 –  Ed Wright
2007 –  Ed Wright
2008 –  Giles Scott
2009 –  Ivan Kljaković Gašpić
2010 –  Giles Scott
2011 –  Ben Ainslie
2012 –  Giles Scott
2013 –  Mark Andrews
2014 –  Giles Scott
2015 –  Giles Scott

Men's Formula Kite

2015 –  Florian Trittel

Men's Laser

2006 –  Paul Goodison
2007 –  Nick Thompson
2008 –  Nick Thompson
2009 –  Tom Slingsby
2010 –  Tom Slingsby
2011 –  Tom Slingsby
2012 –  Tom Slingsby
2013 –  Sam Meech
2015 –  Philipp Buhl

Men's RS:X

2006 –  Nick Dempsey
2007 –  Nick Dempsey
2008 –  Shahar Zubari
2009 –  Ricardo Santos
2010 –  João Rodrigues
2011 –  Nick Dempsey
2012 –  Dorian van Rijsselberge
2013 –  Nick Dempsey
2014 –  Nick Dempsey
2015 –  Nick Dempsey

Men's Star

2009 –  Iain Percy & Andrew Simpson
2010 –  Peter O'Leary & Frithjof Kleen
2011 –  Robert Scheidt & Bruno Prada
2012 –  Peter O'Leary & David Burrows

Women's 470

2006 –  Ally Martin & Lottie Clay
2007 –  Christina Bassadone & Saskia Clark
2008 –  Tara Pacheco & Berta Betanzos
2009 –  Lisa Westerhof & Lobke Berkhout
2010 –  Ai Kondo & Wakako Tabata
2011 –  Jo Aleh & Polly Powrie
2012 –  Jo Aleh & Polly Powrie
2014 –  Sophie Weguelin & Eilidh McIntyre
2015 –  Hannah Mills & Saskia Clark

Women's 49er FX

2013 –  Charlotte Dobson & Nicola Groves
2014 –  Annemiek Bekkering & Annette Duetz
2015 –  Martine Soffiatti Grael & Kahena Kunze

Women's Elliott 6m

2009 –  Renee Groeneveld, Annemieke Bes & Brechtje van der Werf
2010 –  Nicky Souter, Olivia Price & Nina Curtis
2011 –  Anna Tunnicliffe, Molly Vandemoer & Debbie Capozzi
2012 –  Olivia Price, Nina Curtis & Lucinda Whitty

Women's Formula Kite

2015 –  Stephanie Bridge

Women's Laser Radial

2006 –  Charlotte Dobson
2007 –  Penny Clark
2008 –  Xu Lijia
2009 –  Sari Multala
2010 –  Marit Bouwmeester
2011 –  Marit Bouwmeester
2012 –  Alison Young
2013 –  Xu Lijia
2015 –  Marit Bouwmeester

Women's RS:X

2006 –  Bryony Shaw
2007 –  Bryony Shaw
2008 –  Blanca Manchón
2009 –  Blanca Manchón
2010 –  Charline Picon
2011 –  Marina Alabau
2012 –  Zofia Noceti-Klepacka
2013 –  Bryony Shaw
2014 –  Bryony Shaw
2015 –  Flavia Tartaglini

Women's Yngling

2006 –  Shirley Robertson, Annie Lush & Lucy MacGregor

Mixed Nacra 17

2013 –  Ben Saxton & Hannah Diamond
2014 –  Lucy MacGregor & Andrew Walsh
2015 –  Jason Waterhouse & Lisa Darmanin

2.4 Metre

2009 –  Thierry Schmitter
2010 –  Damien Seguin
2011 –  Isabella Walsh
2012 –  Thierry Schmitter
2013 –  Megan Pascoe
2014 –  Megan Pascoe
2015 –  Helena Lucas

Skud 18

2009 –  Scott Whitman & Julia Dorsett
2010 –  Daniel Fitzgibbon & Rachael Cox
2011 –  Daniel Fitzgibbon & Liesl Tesch
2012 –  Alexandra Rickham & Niki Birrell
2015 –  Alexandra Rickham & Niki Birrell

Sonar

2009 –  Alphonsus Doerr, Maureen McKinnon-Tucker & Hugh Freund
2010 –  Udo Hessels, Marcel van de Veen & Mischa Rossen
2011 –  John Robertson, Hannah Stodel & Stephen Thomas
2012 –  John Robertson, Hannah Stodel & Stephen Thomas
2013 –  John Robertson, Hannah Stodel & Stephen Thomas
2014 –  John Robertson, Hannah Stodel & Stephen Thomas
2015 –  Colin Harrison, Jonathan Harris & Russell Boaden

Tornado

2006 –  Leigh McMillan & Will Howden
2007 –  Leigh McMillan & Will Howden

References

Annual sporting events in the United Kingdom
Sailing competitions in the United Kingdom
Sailing regattas
Recurring sporting events established in 2006
Sailing World Cup
EUROSAF Champions Sailing Cup
2006 establishments in England
Sport in Weymouth, Dorset